Domagoj Torbarina (born April 1, 1992 in Zagreb, Croatia) is a Croatian footballer.

Career 
Domagoj made his professional debut for NK Zadar in the Croatian 1st division. After, he played for NK Rastane and HNK Gorica in the Croatian 2nd division and Primorac Biograd in Croatian third league.

In July 2013 Domagoj transferred to Hamm Benfica.

References

External links
 

1992 births
Living people
Footballers from Zagreb
Association football defenders
Croatian footballers
Croatia youth international footballers
NK Zadar players
HNK Gorica players
HNK Primorac Biograd na Moru players
FC RM Hamm Benfica players
NK GOŠK Dubrovnik players
Croatian Football League players
First Football League (Croatia) players
Croatian expatriate footballers
Expatriate footballers in Luxembourg
Croatian expatriate sportspeople in Luxembourg